Assembleia Legislativa may refer to:
 Brazil
 Legislative Assembly of Amazonas (Assembleia Legislativa do Estado do Amazonas)
 Legislative Assembly of São Paulo (Assembleia Legislativa do Estado de São Paulo)
 China
 Legislative Assembly of Macau (Assembleia Legislativa de Macau)
 Portugal
 Legislative Assembly of the Azores (Assembleia Legislativa dos Açores)
 Legislative Assembly of Madeira (Assembleia Legislativa da Madeira)